Dr Dukinfield Henry Scott FRS  HFRSE LLD (28 November 1854 – 29 January 1934) was a British botanist.

Biography

Scott was born in London on 28 November 1854, the fifth and youngest son of architect Sir George Gilbert Scott and his wife Caroline Oldrid.

Scott studied Natural Sciences at Oxford University, graduating with his M.A., and then as a postgraduate at Würzburg University in Germany, where he studied under the famous botanist Julius von Sachs, and earned his doctorate.

In 1882, Scott was appointed Assistant to the Professor of Botany at University College, London, and in 1885 as Assistant Professor in Biology (Botany) at the Royal College of Science, South Kensington. He was the first lecturer in botany at University College who allowed women to attend his classes. One of his most brilliant students was Harold Wager, who went on to become a Fellow of the Royal Society of London in 1904.

In 1892, Scott was appointed the first Keeper of the Jodrell Laboratory at the Royal Botanic Gardens, Kew, a position he held for fourteen years until 1906, under the Directorship of the botanist William Turner Thiselton-Dyer, one of his early mentors.

He moved with his family to East Oakley House near Basingstoke, in Hampshire in 1906. He continued to research and publish from there until his death.

Throughout his life, Scott published many books and papers on botany and palaeobotany in scientific journals. He worked closely with specialists in paleobotany such as William Crawford Williamson and Francis Wall Oliver. He supported the education of women and was the first lecturer in botany at University College who allowed women to attend his classes.

In addition to his research, Scott provided considerable service to the wider scientific community. He was  General Secretary of the British Association from 1900 to 1903, and President of the Royal Microscopical Society from 1904 to 1906. He was the Botanical Secretary of the Linnean Society from 1902 to 1908 and its President from 1908 to 1912. He was President of the Palseobotanical Section of the International Botanical Congress at Cambridge in 1930.

Scott received many awards and honours. He was elected a member of the Royal Swedish Academy of Sciences in 1916 and a Fellow of the Royal Society in June 1894. In 1930 he was elected an Honorary Fellow of the Royal Society of Edinburgh.

He was awarded the Royal Medal of the Royal Society in 1906, the Gold Medal of the Linnean Society in 1921, the Darwin Medal of the Royal Society in 1926 and the Wollaston Medal of the Geological Society of London in 1928. He was awarded an Honorary Doctorate of Science of Manchester University, a Doctor of Laws in Aberdeen, and Honorary or Corresponding Membership of many foreign academies, including the French Academy of Sciences.

Family

In 1887 he married Henderina Victoria Klaassen (d.1929), who had been one of his first students (d.1929). She continued to carry out research after their marriage, and also provided illustrations and indexes for some of his books and catalogued his collection of fossil slides. They had seven children, one of whom died in infancy..

Selected publications
Scott, Dukinfield Henry (1894, 1896.) An Introduction to Structural Biology. (2 volumes).

References

External links

1854 births
1934 deaths
Botanists active in Kew Gardens
Royal Medal winners
Dukinfield Henry
Wollaston Medal winners
Fellows of the Linnean Society of London
Members of the Royal Swedish Academy of Sciences
Fellows of the Royal Society
Members of the Royal Society of Sciences in Uppsala